Firooz Zahedi (born 1949) is an American photographer of Iranian descent.

Early life
Firooz Zahedi was born in Tehran, Iran in 1949. His family moved to England where he received his secondary education. In 1969 he came to the US to attend George Washington University in Washington DC.  He graduated with a degree in Foreign Service in 1973.

Career
After graduation, Zahedi served briefly as a diplomat for the former government of Iran but resigned to go to the Corcoran School of Art from which he received a degree in visual communication in 1976.

While at art school he began photographing for Andy Warhol’s Interview magazine and served as its Washington DC correspondent.

In May 1976 he met and became friends with Elizabeth Taylor and soon after they traveled together to Iran.  The photographs from that trip, which included the actress dressed in local tribal costumes, alongside portraits he took of her on the set of A little Night Music in Vienna became the subject of the cover story of Andy Warhol's Interview magazine in October 1976.

In 1978 he accompanied Elizabeth Taylor to Hollywood as her personal photographer on the set of the film Return Engagement.

He settled in Los Angeles to pursue his photographic career. He subsequently moved to Los Angeles, and started his professional career as a photographer.

In 1988 he was assigned by Vanity Fair to shoot for the magazine. Soon after he was placed under contract by that publication.  His editorial work has appeared internationally on the covers of such magazines as Vanity Fair, Vogue, GQ, Town & Country, Glamour, InStyle, Time, Architectural Digest and Entertainment Weekly.

Some of the celebrities he has photographed include Angelina Jolie, Jennifer Lopez, Cate Blanchett, Leonardo DiCaprio, Samuel L. Jackson, Bette Midler, Meryl Streep, Diane Keaton, Nicole Kidman, John Travolta, Oprah Winfrey and Ellen DeGeneres.

Zahedi shot covers for a number of Barbra Streisand's albums, including Release Me, Love is the Answer, Back to Broadway, and Timeless: Live in Concert.

Firooz has appeared as a guest photographer on CW's America's Next Top Model.

Exhibitions
In February 2011 a collection of his photographs of Elizabeth Taylor in Iran was exhibited at the Los Angeles County museum of Art.

His portraits and fine art photography have been shown in New York at the Staley Wise gallery and Leila Heller Gallery. Internationally at the Laleh June Gallery in Basel, Switzerland, and the Doha and Dubai Art Fairs.

A solo show of his work, Firooz Zahedi: Photographs and collages was held April 26 to June 7, 2014, at the Paul Kopeikin Gallery in Los Angeles.

Personal life
Zahedi's son, Darian, is also a photographer as well as a musician. He has played with bands including The Rondelles and CRX. In 2012, Zahedi married Beth Rudin DeWoody, daughter of New York City real estate developer Lewis Rudin.

Selected works

Movie posters

Pulp Fiction
Edward Scissorhands
The Addams Family
Get Shorty
Jackie Brown.

Book covers

Goldie, A Lotus Grows in the Mud by Goldie Hawn
My Passion for Design by Barbra Streisand
Prime Time by Jane Fonda

References

External links
 Official site
  Retrieved 2011-06-29

American photographers
American people of Iranian descent
1949 births
Living people
Iranian emigrants to the United Kingdom
British emigrants to the United States
Rudin family